Cheering a Husband is a 1914 short film starring Wallace Beery, produced by the Essanay Film Manufacturing Company, and distributed by the General Film Company.

External links
 Cheering a Husband at the Internet Movie Database

1914 films
1914 short films
American silent short films
Essanay Studios films
American black-and-white films
1910s American films